Stefano Ugolini (died 1681) was a Roman Catholic prelate who served as Titular Patriarch of Constantinople (1667–1681) and Titular Archbishop of Corinthus (1666–1667).

Biography
On 29 Mar 1666, Stefano Ugolini was appointed during the papacy of Pope Alexander VII as Titular Archbishop of Corinthus.
On 11 Apr 1666, he was consecrated bishop by Giulio Rospigliosi, Cardinal-Priest of San Sisto, with Ottaviano Carafa, Titular Archbishop of Patrae, serving as co-consecrators. 
On 18 Apr 1667, he was appointed during the papacy of Pope Alexander VII as Titular Patriarch of Constantinople.
He served as Titular Patriarch of Constantinople until his death on 10 Jul 1681.

Episcopal succession
While bishop, he was the principal consecrator of:

and the principal co-consecrator of:

References

External links and additional sources
 (for Chronology of Bishops) 
 (for Chronology of Bishops) 

17th-century Roman Catholic titular bishops
Bishops appointed by Pope Alexander VII
1681 deaths